Bithiga is a genus of moths of the family Erebidae. The genus was erected by Francis Walker in 1865.

Species
Bithiga rubrisparsa Walker, 1865
Bithiga ardesiaca Schaus, 1912

References

Calpinae